Carlos Eduardo Barreto Silva (born ) is a Brazilian indoor volleyball player. He is a current member of the Brazil men's national volleyball team.

Sporting achievements

Clubs

FIVB Club World Championship
  2013 – with Sada Cruzeiro
  2015 – with Sada Cruzeiro

National team
 2013  FIVB U21 World Championship
 2015  Pan-American Cup
 2015  Pan American Games
 2015  South American Championship
 2018  FIVB World Championship
 2019  Pan American Games

Individuals
 2019 Pan American Games – Best Outside Spiker

References

External links
 FIVB Biography

1994 births
Living people
Brazilian men's volleyball players
Place of birth missing (living people)
Pan American Games medalists in volleyball
Pan American Games silver medalists for Brazil
Pan American Games bronze medalists for Brazil
Volleyball players at the 2015 Pan American Games
Volleyball players at the 2019 Pan American Games
Medalists at the 2015 Pan American Games
Medalists at the 2019 Pan American Games